Fausto Bormetti (born 20 May 1965) is an Italian cross-country skier. He competed in the men's 50 kilometre freestyle event at the 1988 Winter Olympics.

References

External links
 

1965 births
Living people
Italian male cross-country skiers
Olympic cross-country skiers of Italy
Cross-country skiers at the 1988 Winter Olympics
Sportspeople from the Province of Sondrio